Australian All Star Jazz Band is an Australian television series which aired on ABC during 1959. As the title suggests, it was a variety series with emphasis on jazz music. The series was produced in Sydney.

The band consisted of Terry Wilkinson, Freddy Logan, Ron Webber, Dave Rutledge and Don Burrows.

The series was eventually merged with Make Ours Music.

See also
Sweet and Low
Look Who's Dropped In

References

External links

1959 Australian television series debuts
1959 Australian television series endings
Australian music television series
Australian Broadcasting Corporation original programming
Black-and-white Australian television shows
English-language television shows